Kashinath may refer to:
 Shiva, the patron deity of the Kashi Vishwanath Temple
 Kashinath (actor) (1951–2018), Indian actor and director in Kannada-language films
 Kashinath Ghanekar (1940–1986), Indian actor in Marathi-language films
 Kashinath Trimbak Telang (1850–1893), Indian judge and Indologist
 Kashinath Singh (born 1925), Hindustani classical musician and Sitar player
 Kashinath (1943 film), an Indian film from 1943 in Hindi and Bengali
 Kashinath, Telugu dubbed version of Tamil film Kasi